The 2010 BMW Tennis Championship was a professional tennis tournament played on outdoor hard courts. It was part of the 2010 ATP Challenger Tour. It took place in Sunrise, Florida, United States between 16 and 21 March 2010.

ATP entrants

Seeds

Rankings are as of March 8, 2010.

Other entrants
The following players received wildcards into the singles main draw:
  Stefan Koubek
  Sébastien Grosjean
  Ryan Harrison
  Radek Štěpánek

The following players received entry from the qualifying draw:
  Kevin Kim
  Harel Levy
  Björn Phau
  Bobby Reynolds

Champions

Singles

 Florian Mayer def.  Gilles Simon, 6–4, 6–4

Doubles

 Martin Damm /  Filip Polášek def.  Lukáš Dlouhý /  Leander Paes, 4–6, 6–1, [13–11]

External links
 Official website

BMW Tennis Championship
Tennis tournaments in the United States
BMW Tennis Championship